Olmstead is an unincorporated community in Logan County, Kentucky, United States.

Olmstead was a station on the L & N railroad between Bowling Green, KY and Clarksville, TN that opened in 1860. It was named after a leader in the effort to build the railroad. Olmstead is also the site of an elementary and middle school. A post office has been in operation until recently in Olmstead since 1862.

It is the location of, or nearest community to, Cedar Grove Rosenwald School which was a historic Rosenwald School built in 1928.  The school is listed on the National Register of Historic Places.

References

Unincorporated communities in Logan County, Kentucky
Unincorporated communities in Kentucky
1862 establishments in Kentucky